Félicité may refer to:

Geography
Félicité (island), Seychelles
Sainte-Félicité (disambiguation)
Sainte-Félicité, Chaudière-Appalaches, Quebec
Sainte-Félicité, Bas-Saint-Laurent, Quebec

People
Félicité Carrel, Italian mountaineer
Félicité Fernig  (1770–1841) sister who enlisted in the French army dressed as a man during the French revolutionary wars
Félicité Du Jeu, French actress

Film
Félicité (1979 film), Christine Pascal
Félicité (2017 film), Alain Gomis

Other
French frigate Félicité (1785)